The 1999 Family Circle Cup was a women's tennis tournament played on outdoor clay courts at the Sea Pines Plantation on Hilton Head Island, South Carolina in the United States that was part of Tier I of the 1999 WTA Tour. It was the 27th edition of the tournament and was held from March 29 through April 4, 1999. Martina Hingis won the singles title.

Finals

Singles

 Martina Hingis defeated  Anna Kournikova, 6–4, 6–3
 It was Hingis' 6th title of the year and the 45th of her career.

Doubles

 Elena Likhovtseva /  Jana Novotná defeated  Barbara Schett /  Patty Schnyder, 6–1, 6–4

Entrants

Seeds

Other entrants
The following players received wildcards into the singles main draw:
  Meghann Shaughnessy
  Brie Rippner
  Olga Barabanschikova

The following players received entry from the singles qualifying draw:
  Paola Suárez
  Adriana Gerši
  Alexandra Stevenson
  Elena Makarova
  Tatiana Panova
  Lilia Osterloh
  Sandra Cacic
  Emmanuelle Gagliardi

The following players received entry as a lucky loser:
  Larisa Neiland

The following players received entry from the doubles qualifying draw:
  Aleksandra Olsza /  Lilia Osterloh

References

External links
 WTA tournament profile

Family Circle Cup
Charleston Open
Family Circle Cup
Family Circle Cup
Family Circle Cup
Family Circle Cup